Godless Savage Garden is a compilation album by Norwegian black metal band Dimmu Borgir. It was released in 1998 by Nuclear Blast and re-released on 3 October 2006 with 2 bonus tracks.

The first four tracks were recorded during the Enthrone Darkness Triumphant sessions which "Raabjørn Speiler Draugheimens Skodde" also appeared on.

This is the last release to feature former keyboardist Stian Aarstad and first to include guitarist Astennu.

Track listing

Credits

Dimmu Borgir
Shagrath – lead vocals (1, 3, 5–8); lead guitar (2, 4)
Silenoz – rhythm guitar; lead vocals (2, 4)
Nagash – bass guitar, backing vocals
Tjodalv – drums

Other Personnel
Astennu – lead guitar (1, 3, 5–8)
Stian Aarstad - keyboards (1–5)
Mustis - keyboards (6–8)

References 

Dimmu Borgir albums
1998 compilation albums
Nuclear Blast compilation albums
Albums produced by Peter Tägtgren